Country Music is the 58th studio album by country artist Willie Nelson. The album consists in a compilation of country music standards. Produced by Grammy-winning T Bone Burnett, it was released on April 20, 2010 by Rounder Records, and according to Nelson is the first traditional album he has ever recorded. It was his first release in the 2010s.

Recording 
The album consists in a recollection of country music standards, Nelson stated that the album reflects his ideal of country music, featuring mandolins, fiddles and steel guitars and compared the album to his 1978 pop standards success Stardust. Nelson and music producer T Bone Burnett had the idea to record an album together while they were playing a golf game in California. The album was recorded in Nashville, Nelson stated "We venture into all kinds of music but this is country music. No one would argue the fact that these are country songs".

Reception 

The album reached number four in Billboard's Top Country Albums, number twenty in the Billboard 200 and number five in Canadian Top Country Albums. It was nominated for Best Americana Album in the 2011 Grammy Awards.

Billboard described the album as "front-porch, rural and rustic country music". Stephen Thomas Erlewine of Allmusic gave the album 3 out of 5 stars, comparing it as lacking in an "immediacy" to his recent works, and stressing a displeasure in the production which "puts a layer of gauze between the listener and the singer." Juli Thanki of Engine 145 gave the album 4 out of 5 stars, complimenting the musical arrangements and song choices. However, she commented that Nelson's vocal performances were inconsistent on a few of the tracks, namely "Satan Your Kingdom Must Come Down" and "Dark as a Dungeon."

Slant Magazine rated the article with four stars out of five. Critic Jonathan Keefe wrote: "the spectacular collection of songs as much as Burnett's ace production and Nelson's first-rate performances that elevates Country Music above the recent spate of country covers records and makes the album an essential addition to Nelson's rich catalogue".

BBC music acclaimed Nelson's voice and performance of traditional country covers: "It’s a long way from "Blue Eyes Crying in the Rain", "On the Road Again" and "Crazy", and has none of the sparing tension of his finest works like Red Headed Stranger. But the great news is that his greatest asset – that wonderfully persuasive and uniquely distinctive voice – remains perfectly intact, and that alone is cause enough to make it an album to be cherished. [...]  Nelson delivers hardy material like traditional "Satan Your Kingdom Must Come Down" and "I Am a Pilgrim" with such wizened assurance, it’s impossible not to feel the love".

The Washington Post described Country Music as "a calm, contemplative and remarkably consistent album", praising specially the performance of "Satan, Your Kingdom Must Come Down": "[...] while Nelson's voice remains front and center throughout, Burnett's fingerprints are all over "Satan Your Kingdom Must Come Down." It's a traditional hymn that nudges Nelson out of his easy-breezy comfort zone, placing those warm, generous pipes in an eerie new context. The musicians barely touch their instruments as they creep along to the song's phantom pulse".

PopMatters wrote: "One virtue shared by both Burnett, the producer, and Nelson, the performer, is an unerring trust that the song itself is up to the task. Both stand amongst American music’s most incisive students of song. That expertise reveals itself in both the selection and handling of each track on Country Music.  [...] it takes someone like T Bone Burnett to remind us that there’s no one like Willie Nelson".

Track listing

Personnel 
 Willie Nelson - vocals; gut-string acoustic guitar
 Jim Lauderdale - vocal harmonies on 1, 2, 7, 11, 12, 13, 14, 15
 Buddy Miller - electric guitar; vocal harmonies on 5, 6, 8, 9
 Chris Sharp - acoustic guitar; vocal harmonies on 11
 Dennis Crouch – acoustic bass
 Riley Baugus – banjo
 Ronnie McCoury - mandolin
 Mike Compton - mandolin on 2
 Russell Pahl - pedal steel
 Stuart Duncan - fiddle
 Shad Cobb - fiddle on 2, 13, 15
 Mickey Raphael - harmonica

Chart performance 
Country Music debuted at #4 on the U.S. Billboard Top Country Albums chart and at #20 on the U.S. Billboard 200. As of May 19, 2010, the album has sold 45,348 copies.

End of year charts

References

External links 
 Willie Nelson, "Country Music" by Billboard

2010 albums
Willie Nelson albums
Rounder Records albums
Albums produced by T Bone Burnett